Puppy is an independent Australian feature film starring Nadia Townsend, Bernard Curry, Sally Bull, and Terence Donovan. The film was written and directed by Irish-born, Australian Kieran Galvin, who also directed the short films: The Burning Boy, Mono-Winged Angel, Contact and Other People. He also wrote the exploitational thriller Feed, (Dir. Brett Leonard) both Puppy and Feed were produced by Melissa Beauford.

Plot 

Attempting suicide, sultry but down-on-her-luck swindler Liz (Nadia Townsend) is rescued by lonely tow truck driver Aiden (Bernard Curry). But instead of rushing her to the hospital, Liz's savior abducts her to his remote farmhouse, convinced that she is the wife who abandoned him years earlier. Cut off from civilization, kept prisoner and guarded day and night by vicious attack dogs, Liz realizes she must rely on her skills as a con artist to talk her way out of this hostage situation. In the satiric tradition of Misery, Buffalo 66, Secretary and Black Snake Moan comes this captivating black comedy about the ties that bind.

Cast
Nadia Townsend as Liz
Bernard Curry as Aiden
Terence Donovan as Dr. Holden
Deniz Akdeniz as Omar

External links
Official movie website
Director's website

2005 films
Australian comedy horror films
2000s English-language films
2000s Australian films